is a Japanese manga written and illustrated by Go Nagai and first serialized from  to  in Weekly Shōnen Magazine, published by Kodansha. This two serializations of Kodansha were originally published in 7 volumes.

This serialization originally produced 31 volumes in total.

In , three years later after the end of the previous serialization, a special tankōbon called  was released by Nihonbungeisha. Seven years later, in  a special one-shot story, was published by Shueisha in a special edition of Weekly Young Jump, Bessatsu Young Jump #14. This story has not been re-printed or compiled yet.

It was compiled in tankōbon by Media Factory in 2010.

In the February 2021 issue of Kodansha's Monthly Young Magazine, it was announced that a new manga series written by Yū Kinutani, titled Violence Jack 20XX, would begin serialization on February 19, 2021. As of September 20th, 2022, Violence Jack 20XX has been compiled into three tankōbon volumes.

Volume list
The series has been published in tankōbon format several times. Because of the different serializations, each version is different from the previous. As such, only a few of them have the complete series (excluding Violence Jack: Sengoku Majinden and Shin Violence Jack which haven't been compiled yet).

Violence Jack

Original edition
Kodansha (Part 1, 1974–1978)

The Golden City Arc is excluded from this edition.

Nihonbungeisha (Part 2, 1984–1990)

Reprints and special editions
Kodansha (1984–1985)

Nihonbungeisha (1989)

A special tankōbon which contains the story arc Jigokugai, better known as Evil Town, released to coincide with the OVA release of the same name.

Kodansha (Deluxe edition) (1990–1991)

Chuokouron-sha (Complete edition) (1996)

This was the first edition to have the whole series up to that point, including all previous serializations. Each volume is around 900 pages long.

Kodansha (Deluxe edition) (1998)

Chuokouron-sha (Complete edition) (1998)

This edition has the whole series up to that point, including all previous serializations. Each volume is around 500 pages long.

Shogakukan (2000)

Kodansha (Serial reproduction) (2018)

Shin Violence Jack
Media Factory (2010)

Violence Jack 20XX
Kodansha (2021–present)

See also
 Devilman

References

Anime and manga lists